

A

 A. Dacosta Edwards Primary – Belleplaine, Saint Andrew
 Al-Falah Muslim School – Passage Road, Saint Michael
 The Alexandra School – Speightstown, Saint Peter
 All Saints' Nursery – Pleasant Hall, Saint Peter
 All Saints' Primary – Pleasant Hall, Saint Peter
  All Saints' Primary Special Unit – Pleasant Hall, Saint Peter
 The Alleyne School – Belleplaine, Saint Andrew
 The Alma Parris School, Speightstown, Saint Peter 422-4688
 The Ann Hill School (special needs) – The Pine, Saint Michael
 Arthur Smith Primary – Saint Matthias, Christ Church
 Asonns Elementary School for Girls (private) – Bridgetown

B

 Barbados Community College (tertiary) – Howells' Cross Road, Saint Michael
 Bridgetown Seventh-day Adventist Primary – Dalkeith Hill, Saint Michael
 Bay Primary – Bayville, Saint Michael
 Bayley's Primary – Merricks, Saint Philip
 Belleville Grammar (private) – Flint Hall, Saint Michael
 Belmont Primary – Belle Gully, Saint Michael
 Blackman Gollop Primary – Staple Grove, Christ Church
 Bournes Private School – Thornbury Hill, Christ Church
 Browne's Private School – Bank Hall, Saint Michael

C

 The Codrington School (private), The International School of Barbados – Society, Saint John's Parish, Barbados
 Cane Vale Prep (private) – Cane Vale Gardens, Christ Church
 Chalky Mount Primary – Chalky Mount, Saint Andrew
 Charles F. Broome Memorial Primary – Government Hill, Saint Michael
 Charles F. Broome Memorial Primary Annex – Government Hill, Saint Michael
 Charles F. Broome Memorial Special Unit – Government Hill, Saint Michael
 Christ Church Foundation School – Church Hill, Christ Church
 Codrington College – Saint John
 Coleridge & Parry School – Ashton Hall, Saint Peter
 Combermere School – Waterford, Saint Michael
 Cuthbert Moore Primary – Saint Helens, Saint George

D

 Darryll Jordan Secondary – Nesfield, Saint Lucy
 Deacon's Primary – Deacon's Road, Saint Michael
 Derrick Smith School & Vocational Centre  - Jackmans, St. Michael
 Deighton Griffith – Kingsland, Christ Church
 Dottin's Academy (private secondary for males) – Navy Gardens, Christ Church
 Dyall's Private School – Sargeant's Village, Christ Church
 Daystars Academy (private) – Maxwell Main Road, Christ Church, Barbados

E

 Eagles Academy Primary School – Strathclyde, Saint Michael
 Eagle Hall Primary – Eagle Hall, Saint Michael
 Eagle Hall Primary Special Unit – Eagle Hall, Saint Michael
 Eden Lodge Nursery – Eden Lodge, Saint Michael
 Eden Lodge Primary – Eden Lodge, Saint Michael
 Ellerslie Secondary School – Black Rock, Saint Michael
 Ellerton Primary – Ellerton, Saint George
 Ellerton Primary Special Unit – Ellerton, Saint George
 Elliott Belgrave Primary – Gays, Saint Peter
 Erdiston Nursery – Pine Hill, Saint Michael
 Erdiston Special School – Pine Hill, Saint Michael

F

 Feels Like Home PreSchool (private) – Maxwell Main Road, Christ Church
 First Class Nursery – Belleville, Saint Michael
 Foundation School – Oistins, Christ Church
 Fredrick Smith Secondary – Trents, Saint James

G

 The Graydon Sealy Secondary – Paddock Road, Saint Michael
 George Lamming Primary – Flint Hall, Saint Michael
 Gill's Nursery – Upton Road, Saint Michael
 Good Shepherd Primary – Prospects Road, Fitts Village, Saint James
 Gooding's Private School – Bridge Road, Saint Michael
 Gordon Greenidge Primary – Bakers, Saint Peter
 Gordon Walters Primary – Bright Hill, Christ Church
 Government Hill Nursery – Government Hill, Saint Michael
 Grace Bible Church Christian (private) – Paddock Road, Saint Michael
 Grantley Adams Memorial Secondary – Blackman's, Saint Joseph
 Grantley Prescod Primary – Pine North South Boulevard, Saint Michael
 Grazettes Primary – Grazettes, Saint Michael

H

 Half Moon Fort Primary – Half Moon Fort, Saint Lucy
 Happy Vale Montessori – Welches, Saint Michael
 Harrison College – Crumpton Street, Saint Michael
 Headstart Nursery – Belleville, Saint Michael
 Hilda Skeene Primary – Ruby, Saint Philip
 Hill Top Prep – Kingston Terrace, Saint Michael
 Hillaby/Turners Hall Primary – Farmers, Saint Thomas
 Hindsbury Primary – Hindsbury Road, Saint Michael
 Holy Innocents Primary – Welchman Hall, Saint Thomas

I

 Ignatius Byer Primary – Lowlands, Saint Lucy
 The Irvin Wilson School – The Pine, Saint Michael

J

 Joan Inniss Prep – Passage Road, Saint Michael
 Jones Private School – Callenders Court, Thornbury Hill, Christ Church

L

 Lawrence T Gay Primary – Spooner's Hill, Saint Michael
 Leacock's Private School – Farm Road, Saint Peter
 LITE Pre and Primary School - Kingston Terrace, Welches, St. Michael
 Lockerbie College (private primary & secondary) – "Lockerbie House", Britton's Cross Road, Saint Michael
 The Learning Centre - Orange Hill, St. James
 The Learning Ladder – Black Rock, Saint Michael
 The Lester Vaughan School – Cane Garden, Saint Thomas
 Lockerbie College – Brittons Cross Road, Saint Michael
 The Lodge School – Society, Saint John
 Luther Thorne Memorial Primary – Wildey, Saint Michael

M

 Maria Holder Nursery – Sharon, Saint Thomas
 Merrivale Prep – Pine Road, Saint Michael  **NO LONGER IN OPERATION** 
 Mount Tabor Primary – Mount Tabor, Saint John
 Milton Lynch Primary School [formerly Christ Church Boys – Water Street, Christ Church

O 

 Oxnards Nursery – Oxnards, Saint James
 Olga Millar Nursery – Six Cross Roads, Saint Philip

P

 Parkinson Memorial Secondary School – The Pine, Saint Michael
 People's Cathedral Primary – Bishop's Court Hill, Saint Michael
 Princess Margaret Secondary – Six Cross Roads, Saint Philip
 Providence Elementary School (private primary and secondary) – Francia Plantation, Saint George

Q

 Queen's College – Husbands, Saint James

R

 River Road Nursery – River Road, Saint Michael
 The Rock Christian Primary – Strathclyde, Saint Michael
 Roland Edwards Primary – Battalleys, Saint Peter
 Reynold Weekes Primary – Four Roads, Saint Philip

S

 St. Albans Primary School Lower Carlton, Saint James
 St. Ambrose Primary – Cypress Street, Saint Michael
 St. Angela's Convent – Collymore Rock, Saint Michael
 St. Bartholomew's Primary – Parish Land, Christ Church
 St. Bernards Primary – Lammings, Saint Joseph
 St Boniface Nursery – Sion Hill, Saint James
 St. Catherine's Primary – Clarke's Hill, Saint Philip
 St. Christopher's Primary – Saint Christopher, Christ Church
 St. Cyprian's Boys' – Brittons Cross Road, Saint Michael
 St. Elizabeth Primary – Saint Elizabeth, Saint Joseph
 St. Gabriel's (private) – Collymore Rock, Saint Michael
 St. George Primary – Constant, Saint George
 St. George Secondary – Constant, Saint George
 St. Giles' Nursery – The Ivy, Saint Michael
 St. Giles' Primary – The Ivy, Saint Michael
 St. James' Primary – Trents, Saint James
 St. John's Primary School – Glebe Land, Saint John
 St. Joseph Primary – Horse Hill, Saint Joseph
 St. Judes Primary – Saint Judes, Saint George
 St. Lawrence Primary – Saint Lawrence, Christ Church
 St. Leonard's Boys Secondary – Richmond Gap, Saint Michael
 St. Lucy's Primary – Trent, Saint Lucy
 St. Luke's Brighton Primary – Brighton, Saint George
 St. Lukes Academy (The Rock, St. Peter)
 St. Margarets Primary – Glenburnie, Saint John
 St. Mark's Primary – Blades Hill, Saint Philip
 St. Martin's Mangrove Primary – Saint Martins, Saint Philip
 St. Mary's Primary – Mason Hall Street, Saint Michael
 St. Matthew's Primary – Jackmans, Saint Michael
 St. Michael School – Martindales Road, Saint Michael
 St. Nicholas Nursery – Stepney, Saint George
 St. Patrick's R.C. – Jemmott's Lane, Saint Michael
 St. Paul's Primary – Brittons Cross Road, Saint Michael
 St. Philip Primary – Church Village, Saint Philip
 St. Silas' Primary – Orange Hill, Saint James
 St. Stephen's Nursery – Saint Stephen's Hill, Saint Michael
 St. Stephen's Primary – Black Rock, Saint Michael
 St. Winifreds – Pine Hill, Saint Michael
 Salvation Army Nursery – Wotton, Christ Church
 Samuel Jackman Prescod Polytechnic (tertiary) – Wildey, Saint Michael
 Selah Primary – Content, Saint Lucy
 Seventh-day Adventist Secondary (private) – Dalkeith Hill, Saint Michael
 Sharon Primary – Sharon, Saint Thomas
 Society Primary – Society, Saint John (closed 8 September 2014)
 Springer Memorial – Government Hill, Saint Michael
 Sunshine Early Stimulation Centre

T

The Irving Wilson School (special needs) – The Pine, Saint Michael
The Learning Ladder Daycare and PreSchool – Black Rock, Saint Michael 
The Schoolhouse for Special Needs – Reservoir Road, Britton's Hill, Saint Michael
The Rock Christian Primary – Strathclyde, Saint Michael
Thelma Berry Nursery – Saint Davids, Christ Church
Twinkling Stars – Passage Road, Saint Michael
Trinity Academy – Eagle Hall, Saint Michael

U

 The Ursuline Convent School (private primary and secondary for females) – Lower Collymore Rock, Saint Michael
 University of the West Indies, Cave Hill Campus – Cave Hill, Saint Michael

V

 Vauxhall Primary – Vauxhall, Christ Church

W

 Warrens Primary and Preschool – Haggatt Hall, Saint Michael
 Wee Pals Montessori – Upton Plantation, Saint Michael, Barbados
 Welches Primary – Redmans Village, Saint Thomas
 Wesley Hall Infants – Kings Street, Saint Michael
 Wesley Hall Junior – Kings Street, Saint Michael
 West Terrace Primary – West Terrace, Saint James
 Westbury Primary – Westbury Road, Saint Michael
 Wilkie Cumberbatch Primary – Pinelands, Saint Michael
 Wills Primary – Elcourt House, Maxwell, Christ Church
 Workmans Primary – Workmans, Saint George

See also

Caribbean Examinations Council (CXC)
 Education in Barbados
 Lists of schools

References

Schools
Schools
Schools
Barbados
Barbados